This is a list of electoral results for the electoral district of Albany in Western Australian state elections.

Members for Albany

Election results

Elections in the 2020s

Elections in the 2010s

Elections in the 2000s

Elections in the 1990s

Elections in the 1980s

Elections in the 1970s

Elections in the 1960s

Elections in the 1950s 

 Two party preferred vote was estimated.

Elections in the 1940s

Elections in the 1930s 

 Preferences were not distributed.

Elections in the 1920s

Elections in the 1910s 

 Nationalist candidate John Scaddan contested Albany in the 1917 election as a member of the National Labor Party, and the primary swing displayed is against that.

 Preferences were not distributed.

Elections in the 1900s

Elections in the 1890s

References

Western Australian state electoral results by district